Fly in the Ointment is the third extended play released by AFI. It was released on the March 31, 1995 on Wedge Records. Tracks 1–3 were re-recorded for Very Proud of Ya, and "Open Your Eyes" is on the re-release of Answer That and Stay Fashionable but with different vocal tracks and mix.

In 2015, for the 20th anniversary, Wedge Records reissued the EP. The reissue featured altered artwork, meant to be viewed through 3D glasses.

Track listing

Personnel 
Credits adapted from liner notes.

 AFI – producer
 Murray Bowles – back cover, individual photos
 Adam Carson – drums
 Andy Ernst – engineer
 Davey Havok –– vocals
 Geoff Kresge – bass, 3-D realization 
 March – guitar
 Eric Reed – cover art
 Matt Wedgley – alternating lead vocals 
 Steve Ziegler – photography

Studios
 Recorded at Art of Ears, Hayward, CA

Release history

See also
Fly in the ointment (traditional saying)

References

1995 EPs
AFI (band) EPs